Climate risk refers to risk assessments based on formal analysis of the consequences, likelihoods and responses to the impacts of climate change and how societal constraints shape adaptation options. Common approaches to risk assessment and risk management strategies based on natural hazards have been applied to climate change impacts although there are distinct differences. Based on a climate system that is no longer staying within a stationary range of extremes, climate change impacts are anticipated to increase for the coming decades despite mitigation efforts. Ongoing changes in the climate system complicates assessing risks. Applying current knowledge to understand climate risk is further complicated due to substantial differences in regional climate projections, expanding numbers of climate model results, and the need to select a useful set of future climate scenarios in their assessments.

One of primary roles of the Intergovernmental Panel on Climate Change (IPCC), which was created by the United Nations Environment Programme (UNEP) and the World Meteorological Organization (WMO) in 1988, is to evaluate climate risks and explore strategies for their prevention and publish this knowledge each year in a series of comprehensive reports. International and research communities have been working on various approaches to climate risk management including climate risk insurance.

Types

Natural disasters and diseases
According to the IPCC Fifth Assessment Report: "Impacts from recent climate-related extremes, such as heat waves, droughts, floods, cyclones, and wildfires, reveal significant vulnerability and exposure of some ecosystems and many human systems to current climate variability".

The following future impacts can be expected:
 Temperature increases
 Extreme weather
 Bumper crops and crop failure
 Polar cap melting
 Changes to Earth's eco-systems
 Epidemics
 Disruption of the North Atlantic current

Economic downfall 
While affecting all economic sectors, effects on single continents will vary. Beside these direct physical climate risks there are also indirect risks:

 Physical risks: Direct risks of climate change negatively impact agriculture, fisheries, forestry, health care, real estate and tourism. For example, storms and flooding damages buildings and infrastructure, and droughts lead to crop failure.
Regulation risks: Governmental endeavors to reduce climate costs have direct effects on the economy. For example, Kyoto-Protocol emissions targets could be realized by implementing emissions trading, requiring the cost of emissions to be quantified monetarily. These costs would be used by companies to evaluate investment decisions. Factoring in emissions costs will cause prices to rise therefore impacting consumer demand. The insecurity of legislation leads to indefinite postponement of projects and investments.
Litigation risks: Similar to the tobacco industry, industries producing excessive greenhouse gases (GHG) are exposed to the risk of an increasing number of lawsuits if damages can be correlated to emissions.
Competitive risks: If companies do not take measures to reduce climate risks they are competitively disadvantaged. This might lead to increasing production costs caused by obsolete technologies and therefore to decreasing profits.
Production risks: Production shortfalls can result from direct or indirect climate risks, i.e., hurricanes damaging oil production facilities can lead to supply disruption and increased prices. Also the price for energy will rise, as heatwaves cause water scarcity, impacting the supply of power plant cooling water.
Reputational risks: Companies publicly criticized for their environmental policies or high emissions might lose customers because of negative reputation.
Financial risks

Vulnerability

Management

Climate risk management

Climate risk insurance

References

External links 

 "All About Climate Risks" esgriskguard.com

Effects of climate change
Insurance
Natural hazards